Government Tiruvannamalai Medical College and Hospital (GTMCH) (அரசினர் திருவண்ணாமலை மருத்துவ கல்லூரி மற்றும் மருத்துவமனை) is a medical college operated by the Government of Tamil Nadu, India. It is situated in Thiruvannamalai Outer Ring Road in Vengikkal New town at Thirinjapuram Union, Thiruvannamalai District, Tamil Nadu.

The college emerged from the 1 April 2012 transfer of the 440-bed Tiruvannamalai Government District Headquarters Hospital (which had started as a government Taluk hospital in 1950) to the Department of Medical Education who then relaunched it as a teaching hospital offering 100 undergraduate places, the first of whom commenced studies in the 2013-2014 year.

References

Medical colleges in Tamil Nadu
Hospitals established in 2012
Education in Tiruvannamalai district
Tiruvannamalai